"No Time for Tears" is a song by The Enemy from their second album Music for the People. The song debuted on BBC Radio 1 at 7pm on 16 February 2009. Following the premier of the song, the band were interviewed to discuss their "New Punk Sound". The song entered the UK Singles Chart at #16 on 19 April 2009, marking the band's fourth UK Top 20 single, selling 12,606 units in its first week.

Track listing
All songs written by Tom Clarke.
Produced By Matt Terry
CD single (WEA455CD)
"No Time for Tears" (Album Version) – 5:15
"Cosmic Dancer" (Live from Union Chapel) (T.Rex Cover)
7" Vinyl Single
"No Time for Tears" (Album Version)
"Away from Here" (Live From Union Chapel)
iTunes Digital EP
"No Time for Tears" (Album Version) – 5:15
"Blue Monday" (New Order Cover) – 2:07
"Tainted Love" (Gloria Jones Cover) – 2:58

References

2009 singles
The Enemy (UK rock band) songs
2009 songs